Perry M. Johannes Ubeda (born 15 September 1971) is a Dutch former super middleweight kickboxer. Between 1992 and 2008 he won thirteen titles (national and international) in kickboxing, as well as titles in taekwondo and pro-boxing and he is also a keen Motocross racer.  Ubeda is now retired and runs his own gym, Ubeda Gym, in his home town of Nijmegen.

Biography and career

Ubeda began his career in 1980 and had his first title fight in 1986, losing to Andre Masseurs in their match for the Dutch Youth kickboxing belt.  In 1992 he fought Sedou Kiatsongrit for the W.M.T.C (now W.M.C) world title but lost.  He bounced back from that defeat by winning the I.K.B.F European title in Clermont-Ferrand, France, defeating his opponent by a knockout.

In 1995 Ubeda won the W.M.T.A world title.  He defeated the reigning champion Azem Maksutaj, knocking him down three times on the way to a first round stoppage victory in Nijmegen, Netherlands.  In 1996 Ubeda won a Taekwondo event in Tokyo, winning the All Japan Open Taekwondo Championship, winning all three of his matches by first-round knockout.  This victory was made even more impressive as he was the lightest fighter at a tournament where some of the contestants weighed up to 90 kg (198 lbs).  Later that year he defeated Rodney Faverus to win the W.K.A. Dutch title.

Between 1997 and 2000, Ubeda would take part in a number of high-profile bouts, defeating fighters such as Ashwin Balrak, Stephan Nikiema and Ivan Hippolyte (their final match of three) and winning the I.K.B.O. world title in 1999 and the World Professional Kickboxing League (WPKL) and I.M.T.F. world titles in 2000.  He would also suffer a few defeats, losing his second fight against Hippolyte in 1998 as well as failing to win the W.M.T.C. world title against Sakmongkol Sithchuchok in 1999 – Sakmongol's relentless kicks eventually breaking Ubeda’s arm in the fifth round of their bout.

In 2002 Ubeda won two more titles, defeating Turkish fighters Şahin Yakut and Yücel Fidan to win the World Kickboxing Association (W.K.A.)and World Full Contact Association (W.F.C.A.) world titles.  The W.F.C.A. title would be the last honour that Ubeda would claim, as years of damage from low kicks had taken their toll on his shins and meant that he would only be able to fight using full-contact style kickboxing from then on.  In 2003 he met Rayen Simson in the first of their two matches at what would be his only K-1 appearance, winning by unanimous decision at the K-1 Holland Grand Prix 2003.

As a purely full-contact fighter, Ubeda would continue to win titles, winning the W.F.C.A. kickboxing world title in 2003.  Later that year he entered the 8-man "Nuit des Champions" tournament, held annually in Marseilles, France where he made the final.  In 2005 he retained his W.F.C.A. kickboxing world title before dropping down in weight to re-match Rayen Simson at the end of the year.  He won their title fight in Nijmegen to add the 72.5 kg W.F.C.A. belt to his collection.  Not one to be known to turn down a challenge, he also entered pro boxing and had reasonable success, winning the Pro Boxing Brill Ben Carré Amsterdam Cup.  He had his last kickboxing bout against good friend Şahin Yakut at It's Showtime 2009 Amsterdam, losing by unanimous decision.

Titles
2008 Pro Boxing Brill Ben Carré Amsterdam Cup
2005 W.F.C.A. Kickboxing World Champion -72.5 kg
2005 W.F.C.A. Kickboxing World Champion -76.2 kg
2003 W.F.C.A. Full-contact World Champion -76.2 kg
2002 W.F.C.A. Thaiboxing World Champion -76.2 kg
2002 W.K.A. Full-contact World Champion -76.2 kg
2000 I.M.T.F. Muay Thai World Champion -75 kg
2000 WPKL Thaiboxing World Champion -76.2 kg
1999 I.K.B.O. Kickboxing World Champion -76.2 kg
1996 [W.K.A. Kickboxing Dutch National Champion
1996 I.T.F. All Japan Open Taekwondo Championship Winner -90 kg
1996 I.K.B.F. Full-contact World Champion -76.2 kg
1995 W.M.T.A. Thaiboxing World Champion -76.2 kg
1993 I.K.B.F. Full-contact European Champion -79.38 kg
1992 W.M.T.A. Thaiboxing European Champion -76.2 kg

Kickboxing record

|-
|-  bgcolor="#FFBBBB"
| 2009-05-16 || Loss ||align=left| Şahin Yakut || It's Showtime 2009 Amsterdam || Amsterdam, Netherlands || Decision (Unanimous) || 3 || 3:00
|-
|-  bgcolor="#FFBBBB"
| 2008-11-29 || Loss ||align=left| Murat Direkçi || It's Showtime 2008 Eindhoven || Eindhoven, Netherlands || Decision (Unanimous) || 3 || 3:00
|-
|-  bgcolor="#CCFFCC"
| 2008-07-06 || Win ||align=left| José Reis || Ultimate Glory 8 || Nijmegen, Netherlands || Decision || 5 || 2:00
|-
|-  bgcolor="#CCFFCC"
| 2008-04-26 || Win ||align=left| Stephen Tapilatu || K-1 World Grand Prix 2008 in Amsterdam || Amsterdam, Netherlands || KO || 5 || 
|-
|-  bgcolor="#CCFFCC"
| 2007-12-02 || Win ||align=left| Youssef Akhnikh || Time for Action || Nijmegen, Netherlands || Decision || 5 || 3:00
|-
|-  bgcolor="#CCFFCC"
| 2006-10-08 || Win ||align=left| Sepehr Zarrin || Battle of Arnhem V || Arnhem, Netherlands || TKO (Corner Stoppage) || 1 || 
|-
|-  bgcolor="#CCFFCC"
| 2005-11-13 || Win ||align=left| Rayen Simson || Time for Action || Nijmegen, Netherlands || Decision || 12 || 2:00
|-
! style=background:white colspan=9 |
|-
|-  bgcolor="#CCFFCC"
| 2005-10-02 || Win ||align=left| Younis Tabti || Battle of Arnhem IV || Arnhem, Netherlands || KO || 4 ||
|-
|-  bgcolor="#CCFFCC"
| 2005-04-30 || Win ||align=left| Juanjo Alvarez || W.F.C.A. - Super Gala Battle to Victory  || Alicante, Spain || TKO (Doctor Stoppage) || 5 || 2:00
|-
! style=background:white colspan=9 |
|-
|-  bgcolor="#CCFFCC"
| 2005-03-20 || Win ||align=left| Carlos Heredia || || Barcelona, Spain || Decision || 7 || 2:00 
|-
|-  bgcolor="#FFBBBB"
| 2003-11-15 || Loss ||align=left| Olivier Cerdan || 10th "Nuit des Champions", Final  || Marseilles, France || || ||
|-
! style=background:white colspan=9 |
|-
|-  bgcolor="#CCFFCC"
| 2003-11-15 || Win ||align=left| Christophe Landais || 10th "Nuit des Champions", Semi Finals || Marseilles, France || || ||
|-
|-  bgcolor="#CCFFCC"
| 2003-11-15 || Win ||align=left| Christophe Tendil || 10th "Nuit des Champions", Quarter Finals || Marseilles, France || || ||
|-
|-  bgcolor="#CCFFCC"
| 2003-09-14 || Win ||align=left| Juanjo Alvarez || Gala in Druten  || Druten, Netherlands || KO || 2 ||
|-
! style=background:white colspan=9 |
|-
|-  bgcolor="#FFBBBB"
| 2003-06-08 || Loss ||align=left| Joerie Mes || It's Showtime 2003 Amsterdam || Amsterdam, Netherlands || Decision (Unanimous) || 5 || 3:00
|-
|-  bgcolor="#CCFFCC"
| 2003-04-06 || Win ||align=left| Rayen Simson || K-1 Holland Grand Prix 2003 || Zoetermeer, Netherlands || Decision (Unanimous) || 3 || 3:00
|-
|-  bgcolor="#FFBBBB"
| 2003-02-15 || Loss ||align=left| Joerie Mes || Xena Sports "Heaven or Hell 8" || Netherlands || Decision (Unanimous) || 5 || 3:00
|-
|-  bgcolor="#c5d2ea"
| 2002-11-29 || NC ||align=left| Najim Ethoullali || W.P.K.L. Muay Thai Champions League VIII || Rotterdam, Netherlands || No Contest (Shin Injury) || 1 || 3:00 
|-
|-  bgcolor="#CCFFCC"
| 2002-09-08 || Win ||align=left| Yücel Fidan || Fighting Party || Rotterdam, Netherlands || KO || || 
|-
! style=background:white colspan=9 |
|-
|-  bgcolor="#CCFFCC"
| 2002-02-24 || Win ||align=left| Şahin Yakut || K-1 World Grand Prix 2002 Preliminary Netherlands || Arnhem, Netherlands || Decision (Unanimous) || 12 || 2:00
|-
! style=background:white colspan=9 |
|-
|-  bgcolor="#CCFFCC"
| 2001-05-20 || Win ||align=left| Yavuz Özden || K-1 World Grand Prix 2001 Preliminary Germany || Oberhausen, Germany || KO || 6 || 
|-
|-  bgcolor="#CCFFCC"
| 2000-12-12 || Win ||align=left| Kamel El Amrani || It's Showtime - Christmas Edition || Haarlem, Netherlands || Decision (Unanimous) || 5 || 3:00
|-
|-
|-  bgcolor="#CCFFCC"
| 2000-10-22 || Win ||align=left| Vitali Akhramenko || It's Showtime - Exclusive || Haarlem, Netherlands || Decision (Unanimous) || 5 || 3:00
|-
|-  bgcolor="#CCFFCC"
| 2000-09-03 || Win ||align=left| Nuengtrakarn Por Muang Ubon || Battle of Arnhem 2 (BOA2) - Rijnhal Arnhem|| Arnhem, Netherlands || Decision (Unanimous) || 5 || 3:00
|-
! style=background:white colspan=9 |
|-
|-  bgcolor="#FFBBBB"
| 2000-06-04 || Loss ||align=left| Ashwin Balrak || The Night of Revenge || Haarlem, Netherlands || Decision (Unanimous) || 5 || 3:00
|-
|-  bgcolor="#FFBBBB"
| 2000-03-18 || Loss ||align=left| Sakmongkol Sithchuchok || I.S.K.A. Kickboxing || Las Vegas, Nevada, USA || Disqualification (Illegal Elbow) || 1 || 
|-
|-  bgcolor="#CCFFCC"
| 2000-01-23 || Win ||align=left| Hassan Ettaki || Day of No Mercy || Rotterdam, Netherlands || KO || 1 || 
|-
! style=background:white colspan=9 |
|-
|-  bgcolor="#c5d2ea"
| 1999-10-24 || Draw ||align=left| Orlando Wiet || It's Showtime - It's Showtime || Haarlem, Netherlands || Decision Draw || 5 || 3:00
|-
|-  bgcolor="#CCFFCC"
| 1999-09-05 || Win ||align=left| Ivan Hippolyte || Battle of Arnhem I || Arnhem, Netherlands || TKO (Shin Injury) || 1 ||
|-
|-  bgcolor="#FFBBBB"
| 1999-12-05 || Loss ||align=left| Sakmongkol Sithchuchok || Kings Birthday 1999, Lumpinee Stadium || Bangkok, Thailand || TKO (Broken arm) || 5 || 0:22
|-
! style=background:white colspan=9 |
|-
|-  bgcolor="#CCFFCC"
| 1999-03-14 || Win ||align=left| Yavuz Özden || || Veenendaal, Netherlands || KO (Back Kick) || 3 || 
|-
! style=background:white colspan=9 |
|-
|-  bgcolor="#CCFFCC"
| 1999-02-27 || Win ||align=left| Stephan Nikiema || Muaythai Gala in Palais des Sports || Marseilles, France || TKO (Referee Stoppage) || 4 ||
|-
|-  bgcolor="#CCFFCC"
| 1998-09-26 || Win ||align=left| Peter Kley || The Fight of the Champions || Amsterdam, Netherlands || KO || 1 ||
|-  bgcolor="#FFBBBB"
| 1998-05-31 || Loss ||align=left| Ivan Hippolyte || Fight of the Decade || Amsterdam, Netherlands || Decision || 5 || 3:00
|-  bgcolor="#CCFFCC"
| 1998-03-14 || Win ||align=left| Vicharn Chor Rochanachai || MAJKF "Saikyou he no Battle' || Tokyo, Japan || Decision || 5 || 3:00
|-  bgcolor="#CCFFCC"
| 1998-02-15 || Win ||align=left| Ashwin Balrak || Chakuriki vs The Netherlands || Nijmegen, Netherlands || KO (Roundhouse Kick) || 1 || 
|-
|-  bgcolor="#CCFFCC"
| 1997-06-07 || Win ||align=left| Sissoko Mousa || K-1 Fight Night '97 || Zürich, Switzerland || Decision (Unanimous) || 5 || 3:00
|-
|-  bgcolor="#CCFFCC"
| 1996-10-26 || Win ||align=left| Rodney Faverus || || Amsterdam, Netherlands || TKO || 6 || 
|-
! style=background:white colspan=9 |
|-
|-  bgcolor="#CCFFCC"
| 1996-05-12 || Win ||align=left| || I.T.F. All Japan Open Taekwondo Championships, Final || Tokyo, Japan || KO || 1 || 
|-
! style=background:white colspan=9 |
|-
|-  bgcolor="#CCFFCC"
| 1996-05-12 || Win ||align=left| || I.T.F. All Japan Open Taekwondo Championships, Semi Finals || Tokyo, Japan || KO || 1 || 
|-
|-  bgcolor="#CCFFCC"
| 1996-10-26 || Win ||align=left| Denis Sharoykin || I.T.F. All Japan Open Taekwondo Championships, Quarter Finals || Tokyo, Japan || KO || 1 || 
|-
|-  bgcolor="#CCFFCC"
| 1996-03-16 || Win ||align=left| Donald Lindo || Thai/Kickboxing Nijmegen || Nijmegen, Netherlands || KO || 1 || 
|-
! style=background:white colspan=9 |
|-
|-  bgcolor="#c5d2ea"
| 1995-03-19 || NC ||align=left| Azem Maksutaj || || Nijmegen, Netherlands || No Contest || 1 || 
|-  bgcolor="#CCFFCC"
| 1993-05-08 || Win ||align=left| || || Duisburg, Germany || KO || 4 || 
|-
! style=background:white colspan=9 |
|-
|-  bgcolor="#CCFFCC"
| 1992-12-05 || Win ||align=left| || || Clermont-Ferrand, France || KO ||  || 
|-
! style=background:white colspan=9 |
|-
|-  bgcolor="#FFBBBB"
| 1992 || Loss ||align=left| Sadau Kiatsongrit || || Thailand || ||  || 
|-
! style=background:white colspan=9 |
|-
|-  bgcolor="#FFBBBB"
| 1988 || Loss ||align=left| Rob van Hetten || || Breda, Netherlands || Decision || 5 || 2:00 
|-
|-  bgcolor="#FFBBBB"
| 1986-11-01 || Loss ||align=left| Andre Masseurs || || Groesbeek, Netherlands || Decision||  5|| 1:00
|-
! style=background:white colspan=9 |
|-
|-
| colspan=9 | Legend:

Boxing record

|-
|-  bgcolor="#CCFFCC"
| 2008-10-13 || Win ||align=left| Steve de Veth || Brill Ben Carré Amsterdam Cup, Final || Amsterdam, Netherlands || Decision (Unanimous) || 4 || 3:00 
|-
! style=background:white colspan=9 |
|-
|-  bgcolor="#CCFFCC"
| 2008-10-13 || Win ||align=left| Melvin Rozenblad ||  Brill Ben Carré Amsterdam Cup, Semi Finals || Amsterdam, Netherlands || TKO || 3 || 
|-
|-  bgcolor="#CCFFCC"
| 2007-10-08 || Win ||align=left| Karen Karapetyan || || Amsterdam, Netherlands || Decision (Split) || 6 || 3:00
|-
|-
| colspan=9 | Legend:

Mixed martial arts record

| Loss 
|align=center|0-2
| Metin Yakut 
| Submission 
| It's Showtime Boxing & MMA Event 2005 Amsterdam 
|  
|align=center| 1 
| 
| Amsterdam, Netherlands 
|
|-
| Loss 
|align=center| 0-1
| Dennis Sharoykin 
| Submission (choke) 
| It's Showtime 2004 Amsterdam 
|  
|align=center| 2 
| 
| Amsterdam, Netherlands 
|
|-

See also
List of male kickboxers
List of K-1 events

References

External links
 

1971 births
Living people
Dutch male kickboxers
Middleweight kickboxers
Dutch male mixed martial artists
Welterweight mixed martial artists
Mixed martial artists utilizing taekwondo
Mixed martial artists utilizing boxing
Middleweight boxers
Dutch male taekwondo practitioners
Sportspeople from Nijmegen
Dutch male boxers
20th-century Dutch people
21st-century Dutch people